The Goupy Type B was a staggered biplane designed by Ambroise Goupy in the early 1910s.

Design
The Goupy Type B was a staggered biplane that could be fitted with main and tail floats, retaining the land uncarriage, to create a hydroplane. The Goupy Type B.1 was a similar 3-seat version, exhibited at the 1913 Paris Aero Salon, powered by a  Gnome 9 Delta 9-cylinder rotary engine.

Specifications

References 

1910s French experimental aircraft
Biplanes
Single-engined tractor aircraft
Aircraft first flown in 1913